Igreja de São Bento da Vitória is a church in Portugal. It is classified as a National Monument.

Roman Catholic churches in Porto
National monuments in Porto District